Assumption Place is an office building in Moncton, New Brunswick, Canada. It is the headquarters of Assumption Life. It is tied for the title of tallest office building in New Brunswick with the Brunswick Square in Saint John, New Brunswick. The building has the most levels of any building in New Brunswick at 20. In 1970 the City of Moncton approved the building. At that time NBTel realized the building would be high enough to block radio signals coming from the  tower they had at that time in downtown Moncton. This was the reason for the construction of the NBTel Tower, now called the Bell Aliant Tower.

Place Assomption should not be confused with the former Assomption Building at 236 St George Street, which was built in 1955. Today that particular structure is known as Maison Commerce House.

See also
 List of tallest buildings in Moncton

References

External links
 Info from Moncton Industrial Development

Buildings and structures in Moncton
Office buildings completed in 1972
1972 establishments in New Brunswick